Wibal & Alex are a Puerto Rican reggaeton duo, consisting of José Rivera (Wibal) and José Díaz (Alex). The song "La Nena del Caserío" is one of the best known of the duet.

Early years
José A. Díaz (ALEX) was born in Bayamon on February 20, 1983 and Joseph A. Rivera (Wibal) was born in Comerío on February 5, 1980. They have known each other since childhood, Alex discovered a Wibal and so formed the duo of Wibal & Alex - Los Dueños Del Bandidaje thus to be able to realize their dreams to succeed in the competitive world of reggaeton. Alex has been writing songs and singing since age 13 and Wibal since age 20.

Career
After their debut in Sangre Nueva, they released their first album entitled El Repertorio by Universal Music and Montano Music. Said musical proposal sold around 30 thousand copies, in a pre-sale made by Universal Music Latino together with Montano Music through the Internet, prior to its official launch.

Their success in sales is largely due to the versatility, improvisation and fusions contained in their album. Although the album includes songs that have already appeared in other reggaeton productions, it combines the rhythms and lyrics of new songs. In the record production there are fusions of reggaeton with R&B, bachata and merengue. In addition to a DVD with five videos of the songs "Gata Psycho", "Presión", "La baya", "Fantasia" and "Hasta que sal el sol".

Producers Urba & Monserrate, Luny Tunes, Naldo, Gómez, Tilo, AA & Nales, Brain, Nesty, Lex, Nelly, Mambo Kings, Bounce, among others, were in charge of the music.

The duo released two singles from a project titled Reggaeton VS Trap Sonido Mundial, a unique concept where the members would release two songs, one in Reggaeton and the other in trap, and they would be competing with each other.

In 2018, they summoned their fans to choose their new promotional theme. Between "Bailar Reggaeton" and "Especial", the binomial was taking the consideration of "Especial".

Discography

Studio albums
 2009: Los Bionikos
 2012: World Edition

Compilation albums 

 2007: El Repertorio

Compilation Albums Appeared On
 2004: Flow la Discoteka
 2004: La Trayectoria
 2004: Luny Tunes Presents La Mision 4: The Take Over
 2005: Sangre Nueva
 2005: Da' Music Reloaded
 2005: Mas Flow 2
 2006: Gargolas 5
 2006: Reggaeton Hits
 2006: Roots of Reggaeton: El Que Habla Con Las Manos
 2006: Reggaeton Ignition Vol. 1: El Comienzo
 2007: La Iglesia de la Calle 
 2007: El Pentágono 2009: El Dúo de la Historia Vol. 1''

Singles
 "Quieren Madrugarme"
 "Saca Las Garras"
 "Flaquiastes"
 "Dame La Verda"
 "Entregate"
 "La Nena"
 "Te Vi Llegar"
 "Te Digo Adios"
 "Gata Psycho"
 "Una Foto"
 "Chica Gargola"
 "Presión"
 "Agitala"
 "Hace Tiempo"
 "La Valla"
 "Tu No Puedes Comprender"
 "Brusca"
 "Hasta Que Salga El Sol"
 "Me Activo"
 "Agitalas"
 "Solo Te Pregunto"
 "Por Ley"
 "Ando En Una Nota"
 "Humildad Prevalece
 "Especial"
 "Vamonos" ft J Alvarez
 "Vamonos (Official Remix)" ft Yaniel & Kenoby
 "Nunca te vayas" ft. Jadiel

References

Reggaeton duos
People from Comerío, Puerto Rico
Puerto Rican musical duos
Puerto Rican reggaeton musicians
Musical groups established in the 2000s